Sir Stelios Haji-Ioannou (born 14 February 1967) is a Greek Cypriot entrepreneur. Born into a wealthy ship-owning family, he is best known for founding the low-cost airline easyJet and the Stelmar shipping line with start-up funds provided by his father, Loucas. easyJet's foundation in 1995 marked the beginning of a series of ventures marketed under the "easy" brand, managed by easyGroup and chaired by Haji-Ioannou.

Early life 

Stelios Haji-Ioannou was born in Athens on 14 February 1967, the second of three children of Nedi (née Potsos) and Loucas Haji-Ioannou. He has an elder brother, Polys, and a younger sister, Clelia. Both of his siblings have a large stake in easyJet. His father's family originates from the village of Pedoulas high in the Troodos Mountains of Cyprus, while his mother is from the village of Laneia at the foot of the mountains. After his secondary education in Athens, he studied economics at the London School of Economics, graduating with a BSc in 1987. He went on to obtain an MSc in Shipping, Trade & Finance from Bayes Business School. He was later awarded four honorary doctorates from Bayes Business School, Liverpool John Moores University, Newcastle Business School, and Cranfield University.

Early career 

A self-labelled "serial entrepreneur", Haji-Ioannou started working in 1988 for his father's already successful shipping business, Troodos Shipping Co Ltd. At 25, Haji-Ioannou received £30 million from his father, that he used to set up his own shipping company, Stelmar Shipping. Haji-Ioannou floated the company on the New York Stock Exchange in 2001. In 2005, Stelmar Shipping was sold to the OSG Group for approximately $1.3 billion.

Exonerated in shipping accident 

In April 1991, a Troodos-owned VLCC oil tanker suffered a disaster that resulted in six deaths and spilt about 50,000 tons of crude oil into the sea, becoming arguably the Mediterranean's worst-ever ecological disaster. The tanker, M/T Haven, was an elderly vessel, formerly the Amoco Haven, sister ship of the ill-starred Amoco Cadiz that had foundered in 1978. Haji-Ioannou was accused of poor maintenance and charged in Italy with manslaughter, in addition to intimidating and attempting to bribe witnesses. Haji-Ioannou blamed the accident on an error by one of the surviving crew members. He and his father were acquitted by the jury. Subsequent civil demands for compensation were also dismissed by the courts.

The "easy" companies 

Haji-Ioannou started easyJet in 1995 when he was 28 years old, running a service between Luton and Scotland. In 2000, easyJet PLC was partially floated on the London Stock Exchange. He and his family remain its largest single shareholders (34%) in the airline, capitalised at £4.17bn as of 9 May 2019.

Haji-Ioannou conducts business via his private investment vehicle, the easyGroup, which owns the 'easy' brand and licenses it to the various 'easy'-branded ventures, including the airline. Haji-Ioannou continues to extend his business interests, mainly in the field of travel and leisure by encouraging entrepreneurs to adopt the "easy" brand for their companies.

easyJet PLC is one of Europe's largest airlines with a fleet of 323 aircraft carrying over 88.5m passengers annually (2018 figures).

Other travel/leisure-related businesses include:

 easyCar, which offers a peer2peer car sharing scheme as well as low cost car rental in 2,000 locations globally
 easyBus, which offers low cost bus transportation between London/Paris/Geneva airports and their respective city centres
 easyHotel, which offers low cost accommodation in city centres across Europe
 easyFoodstore is a new concept, currently being trialled with a view to offering discounted, "white-label" groceries to low-income and benefit dependent groups.
 easyGym which offers low cost, no-contract gym memberships at 16 locations in the UK and five in France, while looking to expand further inside the EU.
 easyProperty which offers an online service to homeowners and prospective buyers as well landlords and tenants.
 easyCruise was a low-cost cruise line started in 2004. It was sold in August 2009 to Greek ferry operator Hellenic Seaways for £9 million and ran until it went defunct in 2010.
 easyCoffee owns a number of self-service coffee machines including a cafe in Central London.
 easyStorage offers low cost storage, some times referred to Self Storage. Customers pay a sensible margin for storage and then pay for all the extras as they need them. These would be packing materials, packing, insurance, as well as collection and deliver
 EasyInternetcafé a chain of internet cafés

Fastjet 

In September 2011 it was reported that Haji-Ioannou was working on Fastjet, a new low-cost airline serving routes within Africa, as part of a joint venture with Lonrho plc. The airline started operations on 29 November 2012 with Airbus A319 aircraft.

Battle with Ryanair 

In 2009, Haji-Ioannou brought proceedings in London's High Court over Ryanair adverts which appeared in The Guardian, the Daily Telegraph and on Ryanair's website in January and February. The adverts featured a picture of Haji-Ioannou in the style of Pinocchio and referred to him as "easyJet's Mr Late Again". The case was eventually settled out of court, with Haji-Ioannou receiving an official apology from the airline and the sum of £50,100, which Haji-Ioannou announced he would donate to his philanthropic foundation.

Disagreement with EasyJet 

In 2010, Haji-Ioannou quit the board of EasyJet, in order to attempt to force the management of the company to abort their expansion plans.

In an interview with Management Today, he said: 'EasyJet is seen as a huge success, which I'm happy about, because I own the brand. But easyJet is a publicly listed company. The share price has gone up and down as it's got bigger and things have happened – but overall, really it's gone sideways.'

He then went on to say: 'Basically, it's created no shareholder value for 10 years.'

In 2013, Haji-Ioannou said he had become "increasingly concerned" at easyJet's expansion plans. He announced that he sold 200,000 easyJet shares in protest against plans to buy more planes, while his siblings have done the same with their shares.

In April 2020, Haji-Ioannou publicly called for the removal of EasyJet PLC CEO Johan Lundgren and chairman John Barton over what he describes as a "deliberate mistake" in not terminating a £4.5 billion order for 107 planes from Airbus.

Personal life

Haji-Ioannou has lived in Monaco since his family moved there when he was a teenager.

In the 2006 Birthday Honours, Haji-Ioannou received a knighthood from Queen Elizabeth II for "services to entrepreneurship".

Haji-Ioannou was a member of the New Enterprise Council, a group set up to advise the Conservative Party on business policy. He stated at the time that this appointment did not reflect his political affiliations, adding, "I agreed to be included in the group of entrepreneurs because I was assured it will be non-partisan. [There is] not much difference between left and right any more."

In an April 2010 letter to the Daily Telegraph, Haji-Ioannou joined 23 other UK business leaders, including Marks & Spencer's Stuart Rose and Next's Simon Wolfson, criticising the Brown government's plans to raise National Insurance contribution rates.

The character of Omar Baba in the BBC comedy series Come Fly With Me is reportedly based on Haji-Ioannou.

In 2018, he filed an infringement claim against Netflix over their series Easy in a UK court, saying that use of the name breaches the Easy Group's European trademarks.

Charity 

His charitable foundation, the Stelios Philanthropic Foundation, supports education, as well as entrepreneurial and environmental initiatives through the provision of funding and advice in the UK, Greece and Cyprus. It also sponsors annual awards with cash prizes to entrepreneurs in the UK, Greece and Cyprus.

The Foundation finances ten undergraduate scholarships annually for students taking a three-year course at his alma mater, the London School of Economics and Political Science, and a further ten postgraduate awards at City University's Bayes Business School (1-year course). It also gives a £50,000 cash prize to the winner of the Disabled Entrepreneur in the UK Award, run in conjunction with Leonard Cheshire Disability. Similar prizes are awarded for enterprises in Cyprus that help foster inter-communal relationships on the island and Greece where the Foundation hosts an award for young entrepreneurs.

Most recently the Foundation has joined the relief effort aimed at helping those in Greece and Cyprus worst affected by the current economic downturn. Its "Food from the Heart" initiative, based in Limassol, hands out free lunchtime snacks to registered recipients in Nicosia, Limassol and Athens. Further outlets to help cope with the refugees landing on Aegean islands are in the planning stage. (www.stelios.com)

He was among the benefactors of the "Make a WISH" charity event held in Monaco in June 2015, organized by the Embassy of the Sovereign Military Order of Malta to Serbia.

See also 
 Cyprus Marine Environment Protection Association
 Low-cost airlines

References

Further reading

 
 
 
 "Stelios threatens to grab easyJet's controls as profits nosedive" The Scotsman, 16 November 2008

External links 

 
 

1967 births
Living people
Businesspeople from Athens
British businesspeople
Businesspeople in aviation
Businesspeople in tourism
Alumni of the London School of Economics
Alumni of City, University of London
Alumni of Bayes Business School
Greek Cypriot people
Knights Bachelor
British expatriates in Monaco
EasyGroup
British billionaires
Cypriot billionaires
British people of Greek Cypriot descent
Naturalised citizens of the United Kingdom
Cypriot expatriates in Monaco
Stelios
Giving Pledgers
21st-century philanthropists